Basavalinganadoddi or Basavalinganadoddy, is a village in Mandya district in the Indian state of Karnataka. It lies on the banks of the river Shimsha. It is 1.5 Kilometers away from village panchayath Kesthur. It is 13.5 Kilometers away from the nearest city Maddur and 94 kilometers away from state capital Bangalore aka Bengaluru.

Basavalinganadoddi is named after the god Basava (Nandi), who is believed to be a mount (vahana) of lord Shiva.
Nandi Basaveshwara is a famous god here & Jatra (a kind of festival) is celebrated after this god's name, which is famous by the name Nandi Basaveshwara Jatra, which happens once in a year during Sankranthi. Kaadudoddi is an ancient name for Basavalinganadoddy.

About half of the agricultural land in the village receives assured irrigation from the Krishna Raj Sagar (KRS).

Basavalinganadoddi's neighboring villages are Yadaanahalli in the north, Kesthur in the east, and Adaganahalli in the west.

Geography 

Demographics 
As of the provisional figures for the 2001 Census of India, Basavalinganadoddy has a population of 706. Males constitute 52% of the population and females 48%.

Education
Basavalinganadoddi has an average literacy rate of 70%, higher than the national average of 59.5%: male literacy is 73%, and female literacy is 63%. This village has 2 schools which teaches from 1st to 4th std.

Business and economy 
Basavalinganadoddi is a prominent agricultural village and it is famous for its Paddy, Ragi(Finger Millet), sugar cane & Tender coconut cultivation. As with agriculture, sericulture is also a source of income to this village. In many agricultural fields in the village mulberry is grown and this is dependent on rains and KRS water supply.

References

External links 

Villages in Mandya district